Timboon  is a town in the Western District of Victoria, Australia. At the 2001 census, Timboon had a population of 787. During the 2016 census Timboon had a population of 1,202 .

The main industries are dairying, forestry, and the production of limes and lemons.

History
Prior to the arrival of Europeans the area was inhabited by people from the Girawurung Aboriginal language group. It is believed that the Timboon's name comes from the local Aboriginal word 'timboun' which was a word used to describe pieces of rock used to open mussels.

The first white man in the area was Daniel Curdie. In 1845 he followed the river that bears his name to its mouth at Peterborough. The river flowed through thick forest at the time. 
The first settlers to move into the area were the Callaways. They were English immigrants who selected land in the Heytesbury Forest in 1875. They had to clear the forest to the west and north of the present township. A small settlement on the banks of the Curdies River that never developed called Curdies River was the original destination for a proposed railway.

A more suitable site was chosen in 1877 on the banks of Powers Creek was known as “New Timboon”. "Old Timboon" was the site of the original Camperdown township. The town began to grow as new settlers were attracted to the area. The first school opened in 1883. By 1889 the township of “New Timboon” offered land for sale confident of the coming of the railway to the area. The town had a general store, butcher and blacksmiths by 1891. In 1892 the railway arrived, the Timboon branch line that construction had started in 1889 at Camperdown.

The first major produce of the area was timber, the train would carry the timber out and return with all the provision a township would require. As the country opened up dairy farming became popular, the production of milk, cheese and butter are still central to the local economy. There is still substantial Lemon farming and lemon and lime production.

The Timboon railway line that opened in 1892 was closed in 1986. The railway line featured several trestle bridges including the now restored Timboon Trestle bridge. The Timboon to Camperdown rail trail now follows the old route taken by the railway. The local railway station that closed along with the railway and the building is now home to a distillery. 
The Post Office in the township opened on 7 March 1887. Two earlier offices named Timboon were opened near Camperdown, the first one operated from 1849 to 1852 , the second after the town relocated, opening in 1853, was renamed Camperdown in 1854.

The Heytesbury Forest east of Timboon underwent clearing for additional dairy farms during 1928-33, and later from 1956 to 1975 the Heytesbury Settlement Scheme released 43,000 ha on which 378 farms were established. The Cobden butter and cheese factory opened a branch at Timboon in 1950. A hospital was opened in 1955, and a high school in 1960.

Today

Children from the district attend Timboon P-12 School, previously known as Timboon Consolidated School.

The town also has a hall for the local cub scouts, scouts and venturers and a popular skate park colloquially known as the "Skatey Bowl". During heavy winters, the road to the bridge floods over.

The town has a number of small businesses including an IGA Supermarket, Home Timber & Hardware store, post office, chemist, newsagent, clothing stores, a baker, hairdresser, Commonwealth and National Australia banks, and a laundromat. There are also a few local farming-related businesses that provide the local farmers with their services.

The local Holden dealership, Timboon Motors, has been a family owned and operated GMH dealer for over 70 years. There are two churches in Timboon located near the school. Another, the Anglican church, is on the corner of Barrett and Church streets on the other side of the town.

Food and drink production

The former railway station goods shed was renovated and reopened in mid-2008 as a restaurant, which also houses a whisky distillery under the name Timboon Railway Shed Distillery. This put the station into use for the first time since being previously used as a Guide Hall.  The former station site also marks one end of the Camperdown-Timboon Rail Trail.

Sports
The Timboon Demons are an Australian rules football and netball club, playing in the Warrnambool & District Football League. The club was created when Heytesbury Demons and Timboon Saints merged in late 2002.

Golfers play at the course of the Timboon Golf Club on Egan Street.
Timboon has a park run that is on every Saturday morning at 8 am.
The Corangamite Lions soccer team based out of the Scott's Creek recreation reserve also draws from the area.

People from Timboon

 Paul Couch - VFL/AFL footballer for Geelong and 1989 Brownlow Medal winner.
 Des Ball - Special Professor in the Strategic and Defence Studies Centre.

References

External links

 Absolute Australia - Timboon

Towns in Victoria (Australia)
Shire of Corangamite
Western District (Victoria)